Mr. Hobbs Takes a Vacation is a 1962 American comedy film directed by Henry Koster and starring James Stewart and Maureen O'Hara. The film is based on the novel Mr. Hobbs' Vacation, by Edward Streeter and features a popular singer of the time, Fabian.

Plot 
Roger Hobbs is an overworked banker who reflects on his recent vacation. Originally, he and his wife Peggy were to travel overseas alone together, but Peggy instead arranges a seaside holiday, which includes their two grown daughters Susan and Janie, teenage daughter Katey, teenage son Danny, family cook, sons-in-law, and young grandchildren.

When Roger and Peggy reach their vacation destination, they find a dilapidated beach house with rotting steps. The shared telephone line and unreliable plumbing are running gags throughout the film.

Complications mount. Their youngest child and only son Danny only wants to watch television. Katey, embarrassed by a new set of dental braces, refuses to engage in any activities inside or outside the beach house. Meanwhile, their grandson wants nothing to do with Roger.

Furthermore, one of his sons-in-law, Stan, is unemployed, which is causing tension in his marriage to Susan. Their children are undisciplined, as Susan does not believe in saying no to them. Janie is married to Byron, a windbag college professor who has a lot of ideas on psychology.

Peggy is quite worried about these issues, but Roger argues that the children must all learn to deal with problems themselves, and that he and Peggy need to stay at arm's length.

However, Roger quietly goes about trying to solve each problem, one by one. After the television breaks, he takes Danny on a boating trip, where they get lost in fog but bond as father and son. He also manages to convince Katey to go to a local teen dance, where she insists on sitting on the sidelines with her mouth clenched shut. Roger bribes a handsome young man named Joe to pay attention to her; Joe genuinely falls for Katey and returns the money. Byron shows interest in an attractive neighbor, but Roger tells him that she is a paranoid schizophrenic, effectively keeping him from a full-fledged affair with her.

Son-in-law Stan has a shot at a good job, and Susan asks Roger and Peggy to entertain the potential employer and his wife for a few days. The couple present as prim, proper, and sober; the only interest the man has is bird-watching, and Roger endures a boring jaunt with him, but they are not what they seem to be. Chaos ensues in a madcap scene involving a hot shower and a broken door lock.

In the end, everybody's personal crises are resolved and the family is actually sad to leave; the grandson is upset that he is leaving his grandfather.

They book the beach house for the next summer.

Cast 
 James Stewart as Roger Hobbs
 Maureen O'Hara as Peggy Hobbs
 Fabian as Joe Carmody
 Lauri Peters as Katey Hobbs
 Lili Gentle as Janie Hobbs-Grant
 John Saxon as Byron Grant
 John McGiver as Martin Turner
 Marie Wilson as Emily Turner
 Reginald Gardiner as Reggie McHugh
 Valerie Varda as Marika Carter
 Natalie Trundy as Susan Hobbs-Carver
 Josh Peine as Stan Carver
 Michael Burns  as Danny Hobbs
 Minerva Urecal as Brenda, the Hobbs' cook
 Richard Collier as the plumber, Mr. Saltonstall
 Peter Oliphant as Peter Carver (uncredited)

Production 
Nunnally Johnson wrote the screenplay for Mr. Hobbs Takes a Vacation based on Edward Streeter's novel, Mr. Hobbs' Vacation. Streeter had previously written the novel Father of the Bride, which was filmed in 1950 and remade in 1991.

Johnson had just finished directing a series of films, and wanted to focus on writing. He agreed to do Hobbs because he liked the story "and I knew something about it."

Mr. Hobbs Takes a Vacation was filmed in California at Laguna Beach and Dana Point. The film was shot using CinemaScope wide-screen formatting, with color by DeLuxe. It marked the first time James Stewart and Maureen O'Hara starred together in a film. They  co-starred again in the 1966 Western The Rare Breed.  During the scene in which Mr. Hobbs escorts his daughter Katey to a dance at the yacht club, Herb Alpert is the trumpet player in the band.

The movie was the first of two James Stewart made with Fabian. "If anybody’s ever blessed, you have to be blessed to work with Jimmy Stewart," recalled Fabian. "He was the most congenial, helpful person I ever worked with."

It was a rare comedy role for John Saxon.

Reception 

The film was relatively successful in the United States and Canada upon its release on June 15, 1962, earning $4 million with an estimated budget of $2 million, but found even greater success when released overseas.

James Stewart won the Silver Bear for Best Actor at the 12th Berlin International Film Festival for his performance, and director Henry Koster was nominated for Best Director. Stewart was nominated for a Golden Globe as Best Actor in a Musical/Comedy. The screenplay by Nunnally Johnson was nominated for Best Written Comedy by the Writers Guild of America. Stewart and Maureen O'Hara were also nominated for their performances by the Laurel Awards.

Mr. Hobbs Takes a Vacation's success inspired a series of light-hearted family comedies written by Johnson. Two of these also starred Stewart and were directed by Koster: Take Her, She's Mine (1963) and Dear Brigitte (1965).

This was the final feature film for actress Marie Wilson.

Critical reaction
Bosley Crowther of The New York Times wrote in his review: "Right off the bat, it is suggested in this wacky domestic report that togetherness is strictly for the birds and that sensible parents, especially elders, should write it out of their books. The Mr. Hobbs of the title, played beguilingly by James Stewart, is very much of this opinion as far as his own brood is concerned."

References

Further reading

External links
 
 
 
 

1962 films
1962 comedy films
20th Century Fox films
American comedy films
Beach party films
1960s English-language films
Films scored by Henry Mancini
Films about families
Films about vacationing
Films based on American novels
Films directed by Henry Koster
Films produced by Jerry Wald
Films set in California
Films set on beaches
Films with screenplays by Nunnally Johnson
CinemaScope films
1960s American films